Campion is an unincorporated community located in southeastern Larimer County, Colorado, United States. A former census-designated place (CDP), the population was 1,832 at the United States Census 2000.

Etymology
Campion was named for John F. Campion, a railroad official.

Geography
Campion is located between Loveland and Berthoud along U.S. Route 287.

Demographics

See also

Outline of Colorado
Index of Colorado-related articles
State of Colorado
Colorado cities and towns
Colorado census designated places
Colorado counties
Larimer County, Colorado
List of statistical areas in Colorado
Front Range Urban Corridor
North Central Colorado Urban Area
Fort Collins-Loveland, CO Metropolitan Statistical Area

References

External links

Larimer County website

Unincorporated communities in Larimer County, Colorado
Unincorporated communities in Colorado
Former census-designated places in Colorado